The Braat Overvalwagen was an armored car or armored personnel carrier that saw service with the Royal Dutch East Indies Army and was created by the Dutch themselves,. It was used during the Second World War's Dutch East Indies Campaign.

History
The Braat Overvalwagen's exact origins are unknown, but earliest known records indicate that they were designed sometime in 1940 by a KNIL Engineer Corps Captain, Luyke Roskott (b. July 25, 1921 - d. ?). 

Roughly 25 at least were made, though higher numbers say 90 models were produced domestically in the Dutch East Indies of all variants. The beginning of these model's names, Braat, refers to the Machinefabriek Braat NV, which had workshops in Surabaya on Java, where they were ostensibly and evidently produced. It is possible, that the 25 estimate is in reference not to the total made ever, but rather exclusively those produced in Surabaya, though this is unconfirmed.

Gallery

References. 

Military equipment of the Royal Netherlands East Indies Army
Batavia, Dutch East Indies
Indonesia in World War II
Armoured fighting vehicles of the Netherlands